Yelyzavethradka is an urban-type settlement in Kropyvnytskyi Raion of Kirovohrad Oblast in Ukraine. It is located on the right bank of the Inhulets, a right tributary of the Dnieper. Yelyzavethradka belongs to Oleksandrivka settlement hromada, one of the hromadas of Ukraine. Population: 

Until 18 July 2020, Yelyzavethradka belonged to Oleksandrivka Raion. The raion was abolished in July 2020 as part of the administrative reform of Ukraine, which reduced the number of raions of Kirovohrad Oblast to four. The area of Oleksandrivka Raion was merged into Kropyvnytskyi Raion.

Economy

Transportation
It is located on the railway connecting Smila and Znamianka. There is some passenger traffic.

The settlement has access to Highway H01 connecting Kyiv and Znamianka with further connections to Dnipro, Kryvyi Rih, and Kropyvnytskyi.

References

Urban-type settlements in Kropyvnytskyi Raion